Kolemarz-e Olya (also Romanized as Kolemarz-e ‘Olyā) is a village in Harazpey-ye Shomali Rural District, Sorkhrud District, Mahmudabad County, Mazandaran Province, Iran. At the 2006 census, its population was 493, in 137 families.

References 

Populated places in Mahmudabad County